Bretignolles-sur-Mer (literally Bretignolles on Sea; also Brétignolles-sur-Mer) is a commune in the Vendée department in the Pays de la Loire region in western France.

Population

See also
Communes of the Vendée department

References

Communes of Vendée
Populated coastal places in France